The following lists events that happened during 1794 in Australia.

Leaders
Monarch - George III
Acting Governor of New South Wales – Lieutenant-Governor Francis Grose
Lieutenant-Governor of Norfolk Island – Philip Gidley King
Commanding officer of the New South Wales Corps – Francis Grose
Inspector of Public Works – John Macarthur

Events
However, he is in England at the time and will not arrive until September 1795.
 18 May – Yemmerrawanne dies in England.
 20 August – A third attempt to cross the Blue Mountains is made, this time led by Henry Hacking; they return on 27th – unsuccessful.
 17 December – Grose leaves New South Wales for England. His positions as acting governor and commander of the New South Wales Corps are both filled by William Paterson.
The first road between Sydney and Paramatta is cleared

Births
 22 March – Frederick Irwin, acting Governor of Western Australia (d. 1860)
 10 November – Robert Towns, master mariner (d. 1873)
 date unknown
 Elizabeth Underwood, founder of Ashfield, New South Wales (d. 1858)

Deaths
 9 June – Possible death of Robert Ross (records are unclear).

References

 
Australia
Years of the 18th century in Australia